Samuel Esposito (December 15, 1931 – July 9, 2018) was an American professional baseball third baseman and shortstop. He played in Major League Baseball (MLB) for 10 seasons on the Chicago White Sox (1952, 1955–1963) and Kansas City Athletics (1963). In 1959, he helped the White Sox win the American League pennant. He was the head baseball coach at North Carolina State University from 1967 to 1987. He was also an assistant coach on the North Carolina State basketball team that won the 1974 NCAA Championship.

He graduated from Chicago's Christian Fenger High School and attended briefly Indiana University.

In ten MLB seasons, he played in 560 games and had 792 at bats, 130 runs, 164 hits, 27 doubles, 2 triples, 8 home runs, 73 RBI, 7 stolen bases, 145 walks, a .207 batting average, .330 on-base percentage, .277 slugging percentage, 219 total bases, 21 sacrifice hits, 8 sacrifice flies and 4 intentional walks.

Esposito replaced starting third baseman Billy Goodman and batted twice in Game 1 of the 1959 World Series against the Los Angeles Dodgers, going 0-for-2.

External links

1931 births
2018 deaths
Baseball players from Chicago
Basketball coaches from Illinois
Basketball players from Chicago
Chicago White Sox players
Indiana Hoosiers baseball players
Indiana Hoosiers men's basketball players
Kansas City Athletics players
Major League Baseball shortstops
Major League Baseball third basemen
Memphis Chickasaws players
NC State Wolfpack baseball coaches
NC State Wolfpack men's basketball coaches
Waterloo White Hawks players
American men's basketball players